Lobakuya is a town in south-western Ivory Coast. It is a sub-prefecture of Sassandra Department in Gbôklé Region, Bas-Sassandra District.

Lobakuya was a commune until March 2012, when it became one of 1126 communes nationwide that were abolished.

In 2014, the population of the sub-prefecture of Lobakuya was 67,969.

Villages
The seven villages of the sub-prefecture of Lobakuya and their population in 2014 are:
 Balokuya (25 573)
 Bréguiagui (4 127)
 Karago (484)
 Kérayo (488)
 Labakuya (14 436)
 Lobakuya (6 786)
 Sahoua (16 075)

References

Sub-prefectures of Gbôklé
Former communes of Ivory Coast